is a Japanese volleyball player who plays for RC Cannes. She played for the Japan national team during the 2016 Summer Olympics.

Career 
Kotoki became a volleyball player at 9 years old. While in high school Kotoki served as captain of the team, and played as setter.

On 1 April 2008 Kotoki joined Hisamitsu Springs.

In March 2011 Kotoki was selected a member of national team, for which she played in the Montreux Volley Masters and the FIVB Volleyball Women's World Cup.

Clubs 
  Okinawa Prefectural Chubu Commercial High School.
  Hisamitsu Springs (2008-2016)
  RC Cannes (2016-2017)
  Hisamitsu Springs (2017-

Awards

Individual 
 2011-2012 V.Premier League - Best Receiver, Best Libero.
 2015 Montreux Volley Masters - Best Libero

Team 
 2011–12 V.Premier League -  Runner-up, with Hisamitsu Springs. 
 2014 - Empress's Cup -  Champion, with Hisamitsu Springs.
 2014-2015 V.Premier League -  Runner-Up, with Hisamitsu Springs.

National Team 
 2015 Montreux Volley Masters -  Silver medal

National team 
  National team (2011-)

References

External links
 FIVB Biography
 Japan Volleyball League Biography

Japanese women's volleyball players
Living people
1990 births
Japan women's international volleyball players
Olympic volleyball players of Japan
Volleyball players at the 2016 Summer Olympics